Bad Wimsbach-Neydharting is a municipality in the district of Wels-Land in the Austrian state of Upper Austria.

Population

International relations

Twin towns – Sister cities
Bad Wimsbach-Neydharting is twinned with:
 Friedrichsdorf, Germany

References

Cities and towns in Wels-Land District
Spa towns in Austria